Pierre Carmelle Warren (born August 16, 1992) is a former American football safety. He played college football at Jacksonville State University. He was a member of the New Orleans Saints, Minnesota Vikings and Ottawa Redblacks.

Early years
Warren played high school football at Marbury High School in Deatsville, Alabama. He was a two-time all-metro selection and was an all-county selection as a senior. He was a four-year letterman, three-year starter and helped the Bulldogs advance to the state playoffs. Warren also lettered in basketball, where he was named the team’s Most Valuable Player and was an all-area selection.

College career
Warren played for the Jacksonville State Gamecocks from 2011 to 2013. He recorded career totals of 166 tackles, a sack, eight interceptions, two interception returns for touchdowns, 29 passes defensed, a forced fumble and five fumble recoveries. He was named First Team All-OVC in 2013.

Professional career
Warren was rated the 12th best free safety in the 2014 NFL Draft by NFLDraftScout.com. Nolan Nawrocki of NFL.com predicted that Warren would go undrafted and be a priority free agent. Nawrocki stated that Warren was "At his best in deep zone coverage, but deficient strength, physicality and instincts will turn some teams off, and he does not project as a core special-teams contributor."

New Orleans Saints
Warren signed with the New Orleans Saints on May 12, 2014 after going undrafted in the 2014 NFL Draft. He was released by the Saints on August 30 and signed to the team's practice squad on September 2, 2014. He was released by the Saints on September 18, 2014.

Minnesota Vikings
Warren was signed to the Minnesota Vikings' practice squad on October 7, 2014.

New Orleans Saints
Warren was signed off the Minnesota Vikings' practice squad by the New Orleans Saints on November 18, 2014. He made his NFL debut on November 24, 2014, starting against the Baltimore Ravens and recording seven tackles. He recorded his first two career interceptions against the Chicago Bears on December 15, 2014. Warren was released by the Saints on September 5, 2015.

Ottawa Redblacks
On February 3, 2016, Warren signed a contract with the Ottawa RedBlacks of the Canadian Football League. After participating in the first rookie practice, he informed General Manager Marcel Desjardins that he no longer wanted to pursue professional football.

Warren participated in The Spring League in 2017.

References

Living people
1992 births
Players of American football from Alabama
American football safeties
Canadian football defensive backs
African-American players of American football
African-American players of Canadian football
Jacksonville State Gamecocks football players
Minnesota Vikings players
New Orleans Saints players
Ottawa Redblacks players
Players of American football from Montgomery, Alabama
Sportspeople from Montgomery, Alabama
The Spring League players
21st-century African-American sportspeople